HMS Medway was a 60-gun fourth rate ship of the line of the Royal Navy, built to the 1733 proposals of the 1719 Establishment at Rotherhithe, and launched on 26 May 1742.

Medway was scuttled in 1748.

Notes

References

 Lavery, Brian (2003) The Ship of the Line - Volume 1: The development of the battlefleet 1650-1850. Conway Maritime Press. .

External links
 

Ships of the line of the Royal Navy
1742 ships